Jan Ahmad may refer to:
 Jan Ahmad, Isfahan
 Jan Ahmad, Kermanshah
 Jan Ahmad, South Khorasan